Janfusun Fancyworld is an amusement park in Yongguang Village, Gukeng Township, Yunlin County, Taiwan.

Ferris wheel
It has 50 passenger capsules and offers views across the Chianan Plain.

Roller coasters
The park's roller coasters include Diving Machine G5 and Insane Speed, both built by Swiss manufacturer Bolliger & Mabillard.

See also
 List of tourist attractions in Taiwan

References

External links